Matty Lewis is an American musician, primarily known for his work as the rhythm guitarist and vocalist of punk rock band Zebrahead from 2005 to 2021.

Jank 1000
Jank 1000 was a suburban pop punk band originally formed in late 1998, in the suburbs of Omaha, Nebraska. The band's original lineup consisted of Matty Lewis on lead vocals and guitar, bassist Danny Isgro and drummer Jake Horrocks. The band were known for their combined catchy, hook filled songs with clever and intelligent lyrics.

Jank 1000 initially started as a garage band in 1997 called "Formula One". Lewis and his two previous bandmates (Mike Haddock and Chris Bowen) played primarily at frat parties and street dances, almost always for free. However, with his bassist and drummer heading for college that summer, Lewis looked to regroup. He hooked up with Bellevue University students Jake Harrocks and Danny Isgro in the fall of 1998 and Jank 1000 was officially born. The three began writing songs and playing various house parties until their public debut on December 27, 1998. When asked about the meaning of the band's name, Lewis stated in an interview from 1999: "It doesn't mean anything really. Most people feel it is what kids say after their skateboard runs have been stopped by the cops. They say, 'Man…that's Jank!" It basically means whatever you want it to mean. Nonsense really. It's just a fun, made-up word".

Jank 1000's self-made debut EP entitled Suburban Punks Are Go!! was entrenched on the Homers Local music top 10 upon its release in October 1999. The first single from the EP, entitled "Misty 540°" (referring to a difficult snowboarding/skateboarding move) became an instant hit on local alternative radio stations KIWR and KTNP, receiving extensive radio airplay. The trio quickly gained a small following and became the front runners in the Nebraska punk scene. Often described as "Raw, poppy- punk rock on speed", Jank 1000 were known to hit an almost unthinkable 6th gear with their audiences. Their squeaky-clean image, anti-drug stance and no cursing policy assured them of audiences far beyond the norm for typical punk music. Lewis stated in a 1999 interview - "It's all about getting up on stage and feeling the music. We just grab out instruments and play as hard and as fast as we can. That's pretty much it".

In the year 2000, after the release of their first independent CD My Love Notes And Her Death Threats, Jank 1000 gained recognition from The Album Network as a Regional Best Seller. Both of the band's releases continued to spend several months atop the local album chart in Omaha. The band quickly built a strong following, and immediately became a force in the Omaha-area punk scene. The band continued touring and energizing crowds with their powerful live shows, playing with major national bands such as The Ataris, All, RX Bandits, The Hippos, The Impossibles, Sugarcult, and Catch 22, and touring around the Midwest area.

In 2001, Jank 1000 grabbed the attention of Singerman Entertainment whose roster included Zebrahead, The Misfits, Motörhead, and Dokken. After replacing Horrocks with Albert Kurniawan, Jank 1000 soon broke out of the Midwest and made their way to take on the Southern California punk scene. The band quickly gained popularity from fans in So-Cal, Nevada, and Arizona after playing clubs and venues to warm reviews. The band even played selective spots on the 2002 Vans Warped Tour. In May 2002, booked, funded, and supported entirely by themselves, Jank 1000 embarked on a national tour hitting 14 states spanning from Los Angeles to New York City.

Shortly afterward the band took a couple months off to write new material and re-write old songs for their second LP Bruised But Not Beaten. Unfortunately due to the strains of writing, producing and recording the new material the band split up in 2003 and the three members went their separate ways, leaving Jank 1000 officially extinct.

Zebrahead
Miles from home and without a band, a financially strapped Lewis put his teaching degree to use in the Washington D.C. and Las Vegas areas. Meanwhile, he continued to write music and play acoustic gigs, while rerecording previous Jank 1000 songs in 2003 and 2004.

In December 2004, Lewis received a call from Singerman, who informed him that the lead singer of Zebrahead, Justin Mauriello, had left the band due to creative differences. Lewis set out to California again to try out for the remaining members of Zebrahead. He was officially named Zebrahead's new co-lead singer and formally introduced to the world at a "secret" show at the Anaheim House of Blues on March 8, 2005.

Lewis left Zebrahead in 2021. He is currently working on his country music project, Mendon Hale.

References

External links

Zebrahead's official site
Jank 1000's MySpace profile

Living people
American punk rock singers
American punk rock guitarists
Musicians from Omaha, Nebraska
American male guitarists
21st-century American singers
21st-century American guitarists
21st-century American male singers
Year of birth missing (living people)